Najma is a former Pakistani film actress. She appeared in more than 100 Urdu and Punjabi movies during the 1970s and 1980s. Her notable movies include Zeenat (1975), Toofan (1976), Sargent (1977),  Shola (1978), Wehshi Gujjar (1979), and several others. She won the best actress Nigar Award in 1978.

Career
Najma started her career with a guest appearance in the Punjabi film "Heera" in 1972. But her first notable movie "Khanzada" came in 1975. She performed as a supporting heroine in the film. The film was a commercial success and opened ways for Najma in the Lollywood. Later, she appeared in several Urdu and Punjabi movies. One of her notable films was an action thriller Urdu movie "Sargent" (1977) which was directed by Aslam Irani. Her role of a club dancer in the movie was much appreciated. She acted as a heroine in the film along with Asif Khan. One year later, she appeared in another successful Punjabi film "Shola" and won a Nigar Award in the category of best actress.

Her last film "Dagand Kapano Palar" was released in 1994.

Personal life
After release of her last Pashto film, Najma married Ghulam Mustafa Rind, a feudal lord from Mehran, Sindh and left the Lollywood forever.

Selected filmography
Najma appeared in 119 films, including 29 Urdu, 83 Punjabi, and 7 Pashto language movies:
 1975: Khanzada (Punjabi)
 1975: Hathkari (Punjabi)
 1976: Baghawat (Punjabi)
 1976: Toofan (Punjabi)
 1976: Baghi Tay Farangi (Punjabi)
 1976: Licence (Punjabi)
 1976: Jatt Kurian Tun Darda (Punjabi)
 1976: Mohabbat Aur Dosti (Urdu)
 1976: Hashar Nashar (Punjabi)
 1977: 2 Chor (Punjabi)
 1977: Uff Yeh Biwiyan (Urdu)
 1977: Dildar Sadqay (Punjabi)
 1977: 3 Badshah (Punjabi)
 1977: Jeera Sain (Punjabi)
 1977: Sargent (Urdu)
 1977: Chor Sipahi (Punjabi)
 1977: Jabroo (Punjabi)
 1977: Qanoon (Punjabi)
 1977: Suha Jora (Punjabi)
 1977: Ajj Dian Kurrian (Punjabi)
 1978: Takrao (Urdu)
 1978: Shola (Punjabi)
 1978: Curfew Order (Punjabi)
 1978: Boycott (Punjabi)
 1978: Sharif Ziddi (Punjabi)
 1979: Wehshi Gujjar (Punjabi)
 1979: Gehray Zakham (Urdu)

Awards

References

Living people
Pakistani film actresses
20th-century Pakistani actresses
Year of birth missing (living people)